The Dunlop Great & British Festival is an annual series of auto races in the United Kingdom. 

The Championships:

Radical Enduro and Biduro - Radical Motorsports racing, the fastest racing in the UK, open to three types of cars.
Mini Challenge - The new Mini Cooper and Mini Cooper S each have their own class.
Dunlop Sport Maxx (selected rounds only) - A new initiative to create an entry level into the BTCC, with a multiple class structure supporting all road cars in their original road-going specification.

Also involved at numerous meetings:
Dunlop Mini Seven and Mini Miglia - for classic minis
Britcars - endurance racing
Westfield Sportscars
Classic Clubmans
Races from the Classic Touring Car Club
Dunlop Motorsport News Saloon Car Championship

Auto racing series in the United Kingdom